Amblecote is an urban village and one of the most affluent areas in the Metropolitan Borough of Dudley in the West Midlands, England. It lies immediately north of the historic town of Stourbridge bordering Wollaston ,Audnam and Quarry Bank, extending about one and a half miles from it, and is on the southwestern edge of the West Midlands conurbation. Historically, Amblecote was in the parish of Oldswinford, but unlike the rest of the parish (which was in Worcestershire) it was in Staffordshire, and as such was administered separately.

Formerly an urban district in its own right, Amblecote was divided between the boroughs of Dudley and Stourbridge in 1966, with the area to the east of the railway line becoming part of Brierley Hill and the remainder going into Stourbridge. This is reflected in the area's postcodes, being split between the DY5 and DY8 postal districts.

In 1974, under the Local Government Act, the entirety of Amblecote became part of the Metropolitan Borough of Dudley, in the new West Midlands county.

History
Amblecote was a village in Staffordshire near the River Stour, which formed the border with the county of Worcestershire. It was originally part of the parish of Oldswinford, which was otherwise in Worcestershire. It was a separate division for rating purposes from those Stourbridge and Oldswinford (the two Worcestershire divisions of the parish). Since rates were separately collected for it, it became a civil parish in 1894. In 1894, under the Local Government Act 1894, the parish of Amblecote became part of Kingswinford Rural District, but became an urban district by itself in 1898. The urban district council of Amblecote used to meet in the former "Fish Inn" public house which is now a Chinese restaurant and historic relics of this time remain at the building, such as the civic clock. This civic clock has recently been restored and opened up by Pat Martin, ward councillor in 2009.

From the 17th century, there have been glassworks in Amblecote, including Thomas Webb and Dennis Hall, and together with the adjoining village of Wordsley, formed the main centre of the Stourbridge glass industry, now known as "The Glass Quarter". The glass tradition was brought by Huguenot immigrants to the area. Glass is still produced to this day in albeit much reduced numbers following the deindustrialisation of the area in the 1980s and 1990s which saw the closure of many of the larger companies.

Other important industries included
Coal and fire clay mining, especially in the north-east of the village;
Fire brick and house brick manufacturing; (George King Harrison & Co., William King and Co and Pearsons)
Ironworks, particularly the Stourbridge Ironworks of John Bradley & Co, which included the engineering works of Foster, Rastrick and Company, which made the Stourbridge Lion, the first train to run on American railways and the Agenoria, another important early locomotive.
Davits and ship equipment.
Agriculture continued well into the 20th century. The ancient Manor House of Amblecote Hall went back to Norman times, and had a farm attached to it. The Hall was probably rebuilt, and perhaps relocated, several times over the intervening centuries, the last Hall was lived in by a number of prominent people throughout the 18th and 19th centuries. The Gittins family lived there until the Hall was demolished in 1952 due to mining subsidence. The farm disappeared when the whole area to the east of the Western Fault was open cast mined to extract the coal in the mid-1960s.

The parish church of Holy Trinity was begun in 1841, and the church completed in 1842 and consecrated in 1844, being made a separate ecclesiastical parish (a perpetual curacy) in 1845 and then a vicarage in 1868. Amblecote Parish Church of the Holy Trinity is almost unique (as is nearby Quarry Bank Church) because it is constructed completely of yellow fire bricks, made by local brickworks (William King and Co) from the local fire clay which, together with thick coal seams, forms the main strata of Amblecote in the east, whilst the new red sandstone underlies Amblecote to the west of the railway line. Local benefactors, such as the Foster Rasterick Ironworks, supplied the iron railings around the perimeter of the church and Amblecote was one of few to retain these railings following World War II when many churches did not keep them.

Amblecote was the location up until 2007 of the Corbett Hospital, presented to the local people by the local born (at The Delph) businessman John Corbett. He made his fortune from extracting brine to make salt in his works at Stoke Prior near Droitwich, and who became known as the 'Salt King'. John Corbett visited France extensively in the course of his business, and in Paris he met and wed Anna O'Meara, daughter of an Irish father and French mother. He purchased the Impney Estate, just outside Droitwich Spa, and built a chateau-styled mansion to try to assuage her home-sickness. "The Chateau Impney" was finished in 1875 and cost £247,000 to build. In 1893 he gave "The Hill" to the local people of Amblecote in perpetuity as a hospital, to augment the dispensary in Stourbridge Town Centre, which still remains on the junction of New Road and Worcester Street, which had been the mainstay of local public health before this time. Corbett Hospital was much extended over the years and catered for all hospital functions, becoming a general hospital. It was allowed to become run down in the mid-1980s, as a new hospital Russells Hall Hospital was built in Dudley to cater for all health-care issues in the Dudley MBC area. The Corbett Hospital was mostly demolished in 2006 and replaced with a new Out-Patients Centre containing a wide range of services and also a new children and family centre.

In 1966, Amblecote Urban District Council (Stourbridge part) was absorbed into the municipal borough of Stourbridge in Worcestershire and the north-eastern part of the Borough, was incorporated within the County Borough of Dudley as part of Brierley Hill. In 1974, Amblecote and the rest of the Stourbridge borough and the former County Borough of Dudley became the Metropolitan District of Dudley under the two tier county of West Midlands and when the West Midlands County Council was abolished in 1986, the Metropolitan District of Dudley became the unitary Metropolitan Borough of Dudley in the metropolitan county of the West Midlands.

Modern expansion
Located within Amblecote is the War Memorial Athletic Ground, home of Stourbridge Football Club (nicknamed the Glassboys) and Stourbridge Cricket Club. Amblecote Cricket Club used to play on land off Church Avenue (now Cricketer's Green estate), to the rear of the Parish Church, before the land was sold to Hassall Homes for housing in the mid-1980s. Before this, the club used to play on part of "Peters Hill" to the rear of the Birch Tree Inn, until the early 1980s when it was sold to Tarmac Homes who constructed the "Broomhill Estate." Amblecote Cricket Club is still in existence and after a period of around 20 years playing at Dudley Kingswinford Rugby Club, their base is now at the Marsh Playing Fields in nearby Kinver. Due to the construction of massive new housing estates, the existing primary school at Amblecote was too small to cope with the influx of new residents. Many residents children on the Stourview estate had to attend schools some distance away, such as Thorns Primary. In 1974, the County Borough of Dudley responded by constructing the new Peters Hill Primary School, which rapidly expanded over time to eventually accommodate some 800 children.

Some of the northern part of Amblecote High Street was demolished in the early 1990s to make way for a major road widening scheme.

These developments, coupled with the nearby Withymoor Village development (classed as part of Brierley Hill), added almost 8,000 new homes between 1964 and 1998 on land formerly used for farming and rehabilitated former coal and fire clay mines, both bell pits and open cast mines, which completely changed the face of the area, and brick works which closed down. Many of the new homes were family dwellings, which saw the rapid expansion especially of Peters Hill Primary School, which more than quadrupled in size from around 200 when opened to over 800 on completion.

The development also changed Amblecote's nature as a settlement, from a clearly defined ancient village separated from Quarry Bank and Stourbridge by fields and pit workings etc. to a coalesced settlement, looking more like a suburban development and the development joined Stourbridge and Brierley Hill for the first time ever and Amblecote became the largest electoral ward in Dudley Borough, with a Conservative leaning, under first Dudley West and then Stourbridge Constituencies, until boundary changes in 2004 created Lye and Stourbridge North  which took half of Amblecote and reduced the Amblecote ward.

Notable residents
H. Jack Haden, writer of several books about the local history of Amblecote and Stourbridge.
John Corbett, owner of "The Hill" and founder of the Corbett Hospital. Salt merchant and future Droitwich MP and owner of the Chateau Impney.
James Foster, ironmaster whose firm Foster, Rastrick and Company made the Stourbridge Lion steam locomotive, the first of which ever to run in the USA and now in the Smithson Museum and its sister locomotive, the Agenoria.
Edward Lindsay Ince FRSE mathematician, born and raised here
John Simpson, former Councillor for Amblecote Ward, Lye and Wollescote Ward, Mayor of Dudley and the first Alderman of Dudley Metropolitan Borough Council. Died 2009.
Jan O. Pedersen, Danish Speedway rider (formerly of Cradley )

References

External links
 Histories of the Public Houses of Amblecote
 

Areas of Dudley
Stourbridge
Former civil parishes in the West Midlands (county)